The Voras Mountains (also Boras), also known as Nidže are a mountain range situated on the border between Greece and North Macedonia. It separates the Pella regional unit on the Greek side in the south from the Mariovo region on the North Macedonia side in the north. Adjacent peaks are Starkov grob (1,876 m) and Dobro Pole (1,700 m).

The mountain range hosts a ski resort and the hot springs at Loutra Loutrakiou (Pozar) on the Greek side.

The mountain can be reached from the town of Bitola and nearby villages on the North Macedonia side.

References

External links

  Greek Mountain Flora
 Tzena - Pinovo - East Voras terrain map by Geopsis

Mountain ranges of Greece
Mountain ranges of North Macedonia
Geography of Southeastern Europe
Greece–North Macedonia border
Landforms of Pella (regional unit)
Landforms of Central Macedonia